Asplenium bifrons is a species of fern in the family Aspleniaceae. It is endemic to Ecuador. It is known only from one population in Pichincha Province. Its natural habitat is subtropical or tropical moist montane forests. It is threatened by habitat loss for hydroelectric power.

References

bifrons
Ferns of Ecuador
Endemic flora of Ecuador
Ferns of the Americas
Data deficient plants
Taxonomy articles created by Polbot